The Spokane Scorn was a team of the Women's Football Alliance based in Spokane, Washington, U.S., which began its inaugural season in 2011. The team plays 11-'man' football, full contact, full pads.

Season-by-season

|-
|2011 || 1 || 7 || 0 || 3rd Northwest || --
|-

External links 
 
 

Women's Football Alliance teams
Sports in Spokane, Washington
American football teams in Washington (state)
American football teams established in 2010
2010 establishments in Washington (state)
Women's sports in Washington (state)